The 2000 All-Ireland Senior Club Camogie Championship for the leading clubs in the women's team field sport of camogie was won by Pearses from Galway, who defeated Swatragh from Derry by eleven points in the final, played at Mullingar.

Arrangements
The championship was organised on the traditional provincial system used in Gaelic Games since the 1880s, with Rathnure and Ballingarry winning the championships of the other two provinces. Two goals in the first six minutes by Aileen Tohill and Paula McAtamney helped Swatragh eliminate the three-in-a-row seeking Granagh-Ballincarry. A late goal by Sharon Glynn secured Pearse's victory over Rathnure, for whom Geraldine Codd had scored a goal in the first minute.

The Final
The original match at Ballymacward on Nov 5 2000 was abandoned after 28 minutes due to worsening weather and ground conditions with Swatragh leading by 0–1 to no score, Pearses’ Sharon Glynn and Áine Hillary dominated the play in the replayed final. Gráinne Maguire had Swatragh's only goal from a free. Swatragh suffered a cruel blow prior to the final when the brilliant Paula McAtamney fractured her foot days before the replay.

Final stages

References

External links
 Camogie Association

2000 in camogie
2000
Cam